The women's giant slalom competition of the Vancouver 2010 Olympics was held at Whistler Creekside in Whistler, British Columbia, on February 24. Following the first run, the event was postponed due to heavy fog in the afternoon; the second run was held the next morning, February 25.

Viktoria Rebensburg of Germany won the gold medal, her first victory in international competition.  Her previous best finish was second place at a GS a month earlier, her only World Cup podium.

Results

References 

Giant slalom
Winter Olympics